Pyramid Dam is a dam on Piru Creek located in northern Los Angeles County, north of Castaic and south of Gorman. Its reservoir, Pyramid Lake, stores water from the West Branch California Aqueduct for Ventura County and Los Angeles County. They are smaller than Castaic Dam and Lake, the other artificial water storage facility in the area,  to the south.

Funding and construction
Construction of the dam was made possible by California voter approval in 1960 of the California Aqueduct project, also referred to as the Feather River project (the source of the water in the northern part of the state north of Auburn).  State bonds were issued to finance the project.  Pyramid Dam, which first began construction in 1968, is 386 feet (118 m) high.  It lies directly behind the mountain rock giving the dam and lake its name - Pyramid Cut - which before the Ridge Route Alternate (later signed as U.S. Route 99) was built through the area in the 1931 to 1933 time period, was just another ordinary mountain.  The highway construction of the Ridge Route Alternate caused this mountain to have part of its mass "shaved" off - reduced in size - and after the work to accommodate highway traffic was finished, the shape of the cut was found to resemble a pyramid, and hence the name.

Statistics
The lake behind the dam, shaped like a Triceratops tooth, has been used for boating, swimming and camping since 1974. The dam and lake were built by the state of California Department of Water Resources (DWR), who maintains them today. The water stored there serves residents, businesses and farmers in Ventura County and LA County.

US 99
During the construction of Pyramid Dam, US 99 vehicle traffic was rerouted to Interstate 5 beginning in 1968.  In the 1968-9 time period, motorists could still drive US 99 from Violin Summit to Hungry Valley Road (since renamed Smokey Bear Road).  After completion of the dam in 1970 Feather River water began to fill the area behind the dam, a plan conceived of even before the construction of the Ridge Route Alternate.  By 1972 the Ridge Route Alternate was fully submerged under the lake's water.  Since then, its northern  border with the lake continues to serve as a boat ramp.  The lake's southern border portion of US 99 is closed to motorists.

See also
List of dams and reservoirs in California
List of the tallest dams in the United States

Notes

External links 

US 99 - Piru Gorge: Pyramid Rock and Dam

Dams completed in 1970
Dams in California
California Department of Water Resources dams
Geography of Los Angeles County, California